Congress Street may refer to:

Congress Street (Boston, Massachusetts), a prominent street in Boston, Massachusetts
Congress Street (Chicago, Illinois), also formerly known as Congress Parkway, a prominent street in Chicago, Illinois
Congress Street (Detroit, Michigan), a prominent street in Detroit, Michigan
Congress Street (Hartford, Connecticut), a prominent street in Hartford, Connecticut
Congress Street (Portland, Maine), a prominent street in Portland, Maine
Congress Street (Savannah, Georgia), a prominent street in Savannah, Georgia

Odonyms referring to a building